Moltkia is the scientific name of two genera of organisms and may refer to:

Moltkia (coral), a genus of prehistoric octocorals
Moltkia (plant), a genus of plants in the family Boraginaceae